The 8-day Blackpool Dance Festival is the world's first and most famous annual ballroom dance competition of international significance, held in the Empress Ballroom at the Winter Gardens, Blackpool, England since 1920. It is also the largest ballroom competition: in 2013, 2953 couples from 60 countries took part in the festival.

As of the early 21st century the festival is held in May. It covers ballroom and Latin American dancing, American smooth and incorporates the British Open Championships in categories of adult amateur and professional couples and formation teams. In 2005 two new categories were introduced: the British Rising Star Amateur Ballroom and Latin Competitions. Two invitation events, the Professional Team Match and the Exhibition Competition, create much interest.

The Junior Dance Festival, Blackpool Sequence Dance Festival which incorporates the British Sequence Championships, and British National Dance Festival are also held annually in Blackpool.

The annual World Professional Dancesport Championship is often held in Blackpool (5 times between 1989 and 2012), but is not connected with the Dance Festival.

The world's largest amateurs' dance festival is the annual Euro dance festival in Rust, Germany, where shows of professional dancers are combined with workshops for a wide range of dancers from beginners to professionals.

Cultural references
It was depicted in the 1996 award-winning Japanese film, Shall We ダンス?, directed by Masayuki Suo and again, in the 2004 U.S. remake Shall We Dance?. Mai, played by Tamiyo Kusakari in the original film, and Paulina, played by Jennifer Lopez in the 2004 film, competed in the Dance Championship when, together with their partners; both suffered a fall during the semi-finals, causing them to be disqualified.

References

External links
Blackpool Dance Festival official website
Blackpool Dance home page at danceplaza
The History of the Blackpool Dance Festival

Ballroom dance
Dancesport competitions
Blackpool
Ballroom dance competitions
Dance festivals in the United Kingdom
1920 establishments in England
Annual events in England
Music festivals established in 1920